April Ngatupuna (born April 20, 2003) is a New Zealand rugby league and rugby union footballer who currently plays for the Gold Coast Titans in the NSWRL Women's Premiership and has played for the Queensland Reds in Super W. In rugby league she plays as a  or  and in rugby union as a number 8.

Background
Ngatupuna played her junior rugby league for the Wests Panthers and represented Queensland at under 19 level.

Playing career
Ngatupuna made her Super W debut for the Queensland Reds in round 1 of the 2021 Super W season in a 47-26 loss vs the NSW Waratahs.

Ngatupuna made her NRLW debut in round 2 of the 2021 NRL Women's season (2022) in a 26-16 for the Titans vs Roosters coming of the bench wearing number 19.

References

External links
NRL profile
Titans profile

2003 births
Living people
New Zealand female rugby league players
New Zealand female rugby union players
Rugby league props